Cerrena unicolor, commonly known as the mossy maze polypore, is a species of poroid fungus in the genus Cerrena (Family: Polyporaceae). This saprobic fungus causes white rot.

Taxonomy
The fungus was originally described by French botanist Jean Bulliard in 1785 as Boletus unicolor, when all pored fungi were typically assigned to genus Boletus. William Alphonso Murrill transferred it to Cerrena in 1903. The fungus has acquired a long and extensive synonymy as it has been re-described under many different names, and been transferred to many polypore genera.

Description

Cerrena unicolor has fruit bodies that are semicircular, wavy brackets up to 10 centimeters (4 in) wide. Attached to the growing surface without a stalk (sessile), the upper surface is finely hairy, white to grayish brown in color, and in zonate—marked with zones or concentric bands of color. The surface is often green from algal growth. The pore surface is whitish in young specimens, later turning gray in maturity. The arrangement of the pores resembles a maze of slots; the tubes may extend to 4 mm deep. The spore print is white.

When a female wasp of the genus Tremex bores into wood near these fungi, spores will become trapped in the wasp's ovipositor.  The spores are carried with the wasp's eggs and will eventually germinate where the eggs are placed. As the spores germinate and form a mycelium, the wasp's eggs will hatch, and the newly-born larvae eat the mycelium. The wasp species Tremex columba requires C. unicolor to grow, as without the interaction, the larvae will die.  However, the parasitic wasp genus Megarhyssa will lay its own eggs within the larvae of the Tremex wasp. The larvae of Megarhyssa, when hatched, proceed to eat the larvae of Tremex, helping control the population of Tremex. 

Spores are elliptical in shape, smooth, hyaline, inamyloid, and have dimensions of 5–7 by 2.5–4 µm.

Ecology
Cerrena unicolor causes canker rot and decay in paper birch (Betula papyrifera) and sugar maple (Acer saccharum). The fungus has a wide distribution, and is found in Asia, Europe, South America, and North America. It is inedible to humans.

Applications
Cerrena unicolor has been identified as a source of the enzyme laccase. This enzyme has potential applications in a wide variety of bioprocesses. C. unicolor is known to produce laccase in culture at more favorable conditions and in higher yield than other wood rotting fungi, and research is focussing on ways to produce laccase cost-effectively on a large scale.

References

Fungi described in 1785
Fungi of North America
Fungal plant pathogens and diseases
Inedible fungi
Polyporaceae